The M35 motorway is a  motorway in eastern Hungary which connects the M3 motorway with the city of Debrecen, providing it  with a direct motorway link to the capital, Budapest.

The section bypassing Debrecen was completed in April 2006, and the whole stretch of road was opened to the public on 15 December 2006. The new road reduced driving time between Debrecen and the capital to under 2 hours. The further stretch from Debrecen to M4 motorway was inaugurated on December 20, 2018.

Openings timeline
 Görbeháza; M3 – Debrecen-south (44 km): 2006.12.15.
 Debrecen-south – Mikepércs (5.43 km): 2017.12.13.
 Mikepércs – Berettyóújfalu; M4 (18.7 km): 2018.12.20.

Junctions, exits and rest area

 The route is full length motorway.

Maintenance
The operation and maintenance of the road by Hungarian Public Road Nonprofit Pte Ltd Co. This activity is provided by this highway engineer.
 near Hajdúböszörmény, kilometre trench 22

Payment
Hungarian system has 2 main type in terms of salary:

1, time-based fee vignettes (E-matrica); with a validity of either 10 days (3500 HUF), 1 month (4780 HUF) or 1 year (42980 HUF).

2, county vignettes (Megyei matrica); the highway can be used instead of the national sticker with the following county stickers:

{| class="wikitable"
|- 
!Type of county vignette !! Available section
|-
|Hajdú-Bihar County
| full length (0 km – 68 km)
|}

Toll-free section
The collection and distribution circuits leading from 354 main road to Kishegyesi út [Debrecen-Ondód] section (37 km – 40 km) are free of charge.

European Route(s)

See also 

 Roads in Hungary
 Transport in Hungary
 International E-road network

References

External links 

National Toll Payment Services Plc. (in Hungarian, some information also in English)
 Hungarian Public Road Non-Profit Ltd. (Magyar Közút Nonprofit Zrt.)
 National Infrastructure Developer Ltd.

35